Jermall Charlo (born May 19, 1990) is an American professional boxer. He has held world championships in two weight classes, including the WBC middleweight title since 2019 and previously the IBF light middleweight title from 2015 to 2017. His identical twin brother, Jermell Charlo, is also a professional boxer and undisputed light middleweight world champion. As of June 2021, Jermall is ranked as the world's second-best active middleweight by BoxRec, The Ring magazine and the Transnational Boxing Rankings Board, as well as the sixth-best active boxer, pound for pound, by BoxRec.

Early life and amateur career 
Jermall is older than his identical twin Jermell by one minute. Both brothers are graduates of Alief Hastings High School in Houston, Texas. They began boxing when they started following their father, himself a former boxer, into the gym. As an amateur, Jermall was hopeful for a spot on the 2008 U.S. Olympic team but was forced to back out due to a toe injury. He competed in the amateur ranks for one more year and finished with a record of 65 wins and 6 losses.

Professional career

Light middleweight

Early years
On August 12, 2008 Charlo made his professional debut against Cimmaron Davis and won the fight via 2nd-round technical knockout. On July 11, 2009 Charlo faced Deon Nash, the opponent his brother Jermell went up against and beat in 2008. Jermall won a comfortable unanimous decision victory and later fought Nash to a rematch on August 28, 2010 and Charlo would end up winning again by a corner retirement. On October 24, 2010 Charlo went up against Puerto Rican Carlos Garcia, whom his brother Jermell had fought a year prior. Both brothers beat Garcia by unanimous decision. Over the next five years, Charlo remained undefeated picking up wins over Orlando Lora, Antwone Smith and Norberto Gonzalez. By the close of 2014, Charlo had a record of 20 wins with 16 coming inside the distance and no losses.

On March 28, 2015 Charlo went up against a highly talented prospect, Michael Kenneth Finney (12-2-1, 10 KOs) at The Pearl, Palms Casino in Las Vegas. Charlo won all of the rounds on all 3 judges scorecards and won a unanimous decision victory. The fight nearly came to an end a few times during the fight, however Finney managed to take Charlo the distance for the fifth time in his career.

Charlo vs. Bundrage
In May 2015, 42 year old Cornelius Bundrage (34-5, 19 KOs) was ordered by the IBF to make a mandatory title defense against Charlo. July 25 was a potential date discussed initially. On June 8, a few weeks prior to the fight taking place, Bundrage was forced to pull out of the fight citing an injury above his left eye. The card, which was scheduled to July 18 was postponed. The deep cut happened during a sparring session. On August 17, it was confirmed the fight would take place at the Foxwoods Resort Casino in Ledyard, Connecticut on September 12. After an 18-month wait, Charlo dismantled Bundrage and captured the IBF light middleweight title with a dominating third-round knockout win. Bundrage was knocked down once in rounds 1 and 2 and twice in round 3. An overhand right put Bundrage down in round 1. Charlo never allowed Bundrage to get into the fight, constantly applying pressure. The second knockdown, which occurred in round 2 was from a left jab. Fast combinations to the head dropped Bundrage early in round 3 and a couple of minutes later, a final blow to the head. The referee did attempt to make a count and stopped the fight at 2 minutes and 33 seconds. After the fight, Bundrage said, "I hand't fought in (11 months), you can't be inactive fighting these young guys."

Charlo vs. Campfort
A few weeks after winning the title, Charlo's trainer Ronnie Shields confirmed that Charlo would make his first defence against veteran Wilky Campfort (21-1, 12 KOs) on November 28, 2015 at The Bomb Factory in Dallas, Texas. Campfort's sole loss on his record came in his second professional fight via majority decision after 4 rounds. Shield's, who had been training both the twins, recently confirmed he would no longer be working with Jermell. He stated it was on good terms and it would not affect how Jermall would perform. Charlo floored Campfort in round 2 with a counter right hand. He recorded a second knockdown the following round after a flurry in the corner forced Campfort to take a voluntary knee. Towards the end of round 3 Charlo hit a perfect left uppercut clean to his left eye of Campfort's, compromising his vision was instantly to take a knee again. Despite beating the count, Campfort complained that he was unable to see, causing referee Mark Calo-Oy to wave off the fight. Over the 4 rounds, Charlo out landed Campfort 62-11, connecting on 30% of his power shots. After the bout, Charlo confirmed he would stay at light middleweight and continue to defend his title, however he wanted big fights. He also praised his jab, calling it the best in the business.

Charlo vs. Trout
On March 29, 2016, it was announced that Charlo would make a defence against former world champion Austin Trout (30-2, 17 KOs) at The Cosmopolitan of Las Vegas in Las Vegas, Nevada on May 21. The card also included top light middleweights Erislandy Lara, Vanes Martirosyan and his brother Jermell. In a close contested bout, Charlo defeated Trout by a 12-round unanimous decision. The judges' scored the fight 115-113, 116-112, 116-112. Charlo landed the harder shots to dominate the action in the first six rounds. However, Charlo seemed to gas out a little in the second half of the fight, and was outworked by Trout. Trout suffered a cut over his right eye in the 10th round from a clash of heads but fought well despite suffering the cut. The crowd booed loudly when the scores were read out to let the judges know that they felt Trout should have won. Charlo landed 130 of 474 punches thrown (27%) and Trout landed 117 of his 490 thrown (24%). Trout received a purse of $300,000 and Charlo earned a purse of $500,000.

Charlo vs. Williams
Charlo's next title defense was set to be against the No. 1 contender Julian Williams (22-0-1, 14 KOs) on December 10, 2016 at the USC Galen Center in Los Angeles, California. The fight was pushed back as Charlo was nursing an eye injury and was given a 60-day medical extension by IBF. There were also rumours that Charlo would vacate the title to move up to middleweight. Charlo retained his IBF light middleweight title with a fifth round stoppage of Williams. Charlo dropped Williams in the second round with a powerful jab. Williams came back and fought a clever fight, making Charlo miss, slipping punches, landing some good counters. In round 5, Charlo landed a right uppercut, dropping Williams hard. Williams got up, however Charlo went for the finish, and got it with a third knockdown after a barrage of punches ending with a left hook. After the referee stopped the fight, Williams went over to congratulate Charlo. Charlo didn't want to embrace and told Williams,"I don't want your congratulations, I want your apology." The crowd noticing the heat between the two corners started to boo Charlo. In the post fight interview, Charlo stated Williams had disrespected him leading up to the fight, he also called out Canelo and Golovkin, stating he would move up to middleweight. The fight aired on Showtime and averaged 321,000 viewers, peaking at 370,000 viewers.

Middleweight
Charlo officially vacated his IBF light middleweight title on February 16, 2017 in order to move up to middleweight. Charlo had wanted to unify the light middleweight division, but there were no titlists available. At the time, twin Jermell, who Jermall had vowed not to fight, held the WBC title. He also stated after the Williams fight that he had been struggling to make weight. Charlo told ESPN, "It was either going to be a big fight for me at 154 pounds, like against Miguel Cotto or Canelo Alvarez, something big like that, or move up," On March 11, WBC ranked Charlo number 2 ahead of David Lemieux and Curtis Stevens, who were ranked number 3 and 4 respectively. The IBF gave Charlo a number 3 ranking. In March 2017, it was reported by ESPN Deportes that an announcement would be made for Charlo to fight WBC number 1 ranked, Argentinian boxer Jorge Sebastian Heiland in a final eliminator.

Charlo vs. Heiland
On June 5, 2017 reports circulated around Argentina that WBC mandatory challenger Jorge Sebastian Heiland (28-4-2, 15 KOs) would be ordered to fight Charlo in a final eliminator. Heiland had been the mandatory since 2015. Early talks indicated the fight could take place on the undercard of the Mikey Garcia vs. Adrien Broner undercard. On June 9, the WBC officially ordered the fight between the two, with the winner becoming the mandatory challenger for the winner of Canelo Álvarez vs. Gennady Golovkin, which would take place in September 2017. The fight was officially announced on June 27. Charlo weighed in a career high 159.2 pounds while Heiland came in slightly lighter at 158.2 pounds.

Charlo became the mandatory challenger for the WBC middleweight title, with a stoppage win over an injured Heiland in round 4. At the start of the fight, it was clear that Heiland's left leg was injured. Charlo first dropped Heiland in round 2 with a left to the head. In round 4, Charlo landed another left hook to the head which dropped Heiland again. Heiland beat the count, but as he was getting up, he stumbled around due to the injury. Referee Benji Esteves stopped the fight immediately at 2:13 of the fourth round to ensure Heiland took no more punishment. Charlo spoke to Showtime's Jim Gray in the post fight interview, "Sometimes the injury can be a decoy. You never want to just jump in and think it's part of his game plan. My coach [Ronnie Shields] told me to stay behind my job like I did, continue to work and it's gonna come." The ringside doctor checked Heiland's leg before the fourth round but let the action continue. Heiland stated that his leg was okay before the fight and the injury occurred in the opening round. Charlo earned $350,000 compared to Heiland who had $200,000 purse. The fight drew an average 500,000 viewers and peaked at 542,000 viewers on Showtime.

Charlo vs. Centeno
On November 21, 2017 the WBC announced that Charlo would have the opportunity to claim the Interim WBC middleweight title against Hugo Centeno (26-1, 14 KOs). WBC President Maurcio Sulaiman explained the reason for this being due to the full WBC title being tied up in a potential rematch between Golovkin and Álvarez. A possible date in January 2018 was being discussed at the time. Due to negotiations not being made, on January 2, 2018 Sulaiman ordered the fight and confirmed it would be sanctioned by the WBC for the interim championship. On January 23, the fight was made official to take place on the undercard of Deontay Wilder's WBC heavyweight title defence against Luis Ortiz on March 3 at the Barclays Center. On February 23, the fight was postponed after Centeno injured his ribs in training. The fight was quickly rescheduled to take place on April 21 on the Adrien Broner vs. Jessie Vargas undercard. On fight night, in front of  13,964 in attendance, Charlo won the vacant WBC interim middleweight title after knocking out Centeno in round 2. The knockdown came when Charlo landed a left hook to the head followed by a right hand to Centeno. The fight was promptly halted by referee Steve Willis. The official time was at 0:55 of round 2. Charlo spend the first round stalking Centeno, who was reluctant to exchange. After the fight, Charlo said, "I'm a two-time world champion. Bring on Triple G! I want that fight! The networks [HBO and Showtime] and the teams can figure out how to get the Triple G fight done. I have the best manager [Al Haymon] in the world. I'm 27-0 with 21 knockouts. Everybody sees it. What more can I say?" CompuBox Stats showed that Charlo landed 12 of 35 punches thrown (34%) and Centeno landed 10 of his 31 thrown (32%). Charlo earned $500,000 to Centeno's $235,000 purse.

Charlo vs. Korobov 
In October 2018, Premier Boxing Champions announced a doubleheader for December 22, 2018 at the Barclays Center in Brooklyn, New York. The card, which would be televised by FOX, would feature Jermell Charlo defending his WBC light middleweight title against Tony Harrison and Jermall Charlo defending his WBC interim middleweight title against former world title challenger Willie Monroe Jr. (23-3, 6 KOs). The twins flipped a coin to see who would close the show. The official press conference took place on October 25. On December 15, a week before the fight, it was reported that the WBC had been alerted of an adverse finding in Monroe's pre-fight drug test. It was reported that Russian boxer Matt Korobov (28-1, 14 KOs), who was scheduled to fight on the untelevised undercard against Juan DeAngel, stepped up to the challenge. Koborov, usually fighting at the light heavyweight limit, was dropping down to super middleweight to fight DeAngel, and now had six days to come down to 160 pounds from super middleweight. The WBC issued a statement confirmed Monroe would not be able to challenge Charlo for the title. They also confirmed the adverse finding was a banned steroidal substance. According to the sample collector, Monroe disclosed that he had used a non-specific “testosterone booster”, as written in the Doping Control Form, however did not request a 'therapeutic Use Exception' for the substance. Charlo vs. Korobov was confirmed on December 17. Korobov had only two pounds to lose as it was revealed the contracted weight limit for his fight against DeAngel was 162 pounds.

Charlo vs. Adams 
On 29 June 2019, Charlo fought Brandon Adams, who was ranked #12 by the WBC at middleweight. Adams came out to box, and was tricky at times for Charlo. However, Charlo still managed to dominate throughout most of the fight, winning it via a wide unanimous decision. Two of the judges had Charlo winning 120-108 and one had it 119-109 for the champion.

Charlo vs. Hogan 
On 7 December 2019, Charlo defended his WBC middleweight title against Dennis Hogan. Hogan was ranked #5 by the WBC at middleweight. Charlo dropped Hogan twice, once in the fourth and once in the seventh round, en route to a seventh round TKO victory. Hogan managed to get up from the second knockdown in the seven round, but the referee decided to end the fight and award Charlo the TKO victory.

Charlo vs. Derevyanchenko 
On 26 September 2020, Charlo defended his belt against WBC #1 and The Ring #4 at middleweight, Sergiy Derevyanchenko. In what was probably his toughest opponent up to date, Charlo used a powerful jab, showed a good chin and a variety of shots to outpoint Derevyanchenko to a unanimous decision win, with scores of 116-112, 117-111, 118-110, and retain his WBC belt.

Charlo vs. Montiel 
On June 19, 2021, Charlo successfully defended his title for the fourth time against unheralded challenger Juan Macias Montiel. Charlo was in control throughout the fight, winning a unanimous decision with scores of 118-109, 119-109, 120-108.

Professional boxing record

See also
List of world light-middleweight boxing champions
List of world middleweight boxing champions

References

External links

Jermall Charlo profile at Premier Boxing Champions
Jermall Charlo - Profile, News Archive & Current Rankings at Box.Live

|-

1990 births
Living people
American male boxers
African-American boxers
American twins
Twin sportspeople
Sportspeople from Lafayette, Louisiana
Boxers from Louisiana
People from Houston
Boxers from Texas
World light-middleweight boxing champions
World middleweight boxing champions
International Boxing Federation champions
World Boxing Council champions
21st-century African-American sportspeople